The Lange Hotel is a historic commercial building and former hotel in the village of West Alexandria, Ohio, United States.  One of the area's leading early farmhouses, it is the latest in a series of hotels on the same spot, and it has been designated a historic site.

The portion of Preble County around West Alexandria was first settled between 1800 and 1810, and the village itself was platted in 1818 and incorporated eighteen years later.  Just two years after the village was laid out, local resident Valentine Mikesell was granted a hotelier's license for the property where the Lange Hotel stands.  Its location was fortuitous for a hotel: the Lange sits at the village's central intersection, along the old road to Dayton to the east.  As the years passed, West Alexandria prospered; sawmills and gristmills were established within its limits, and before long it was a commercial center for the surrounding agricultural countryside.  A larger lodging facility, the Eagle Hotel, occupied the present site by the 1880s, but it was demolished for the construction of the present building in 1887.

West Alexandria's hilltop site near Twin Creek and its location along a major road made it the junction of multiple important transportation arteries.  By the 1880s, a new hotel was needed, and the result was the present frame two-and-a-half-story building with Italianate elements, built on a foundation of limestone.  Despite the new construction, there was soon a lack of space, so a two-story wing was constructed on the western side of the original building in 1904.  Today, the hotel remains on a busy street — Dayton Street is now U.S. Route 35 — but by the early 1990s, it had ceased to be a hotel and was vacant.  Nevertheless, it retained its structural integrity; in January 1991, the hotel was declared historically significant enough and sufficiently well preserved to warrant addition to the National Register of Historic Places, a designation that it officially received on 25 January.  Essential to its status as a historic site was its rôle in the community's history as a transportation center.

References

Hotel buildings completed in 1887
Defunct hotels in Ohio
Hotel buildings on the National Register of Historic Places in Ohio
Italianate architecture in Ohio
Commercial buildings on the National Register of Historic Places in Ohio
Buildings and structures in Preble County, Ohio
National Register of Historic Places in Preble County, Ohio